Chionanthus rugosus grows as a tree up to  tall, with a trunk diameter of up to . The bark is greyish. The specific epithet rugosus is from the Latin meaning "rough", referring to the fruit. Its habitat is lowland mixed dipterocarp forest. C. rugosus is endemic to Borneo.

References

rugosus
Endemic flora of Borneo
Trees of Borneo
Plants described in 1980